Mount Avejaha Sign Language is a village sign language of Papua New Guinea. It is spoken in a remote village with many deaf children in the foothills of Mount Avejaha, in Oro Province. It is dissimilar from other village sign languages in New Guinea. The deaf are well integrated into the community.

References

External links
Language Development among the Deaf in a remote village in PNG, SIL International

Village sign languages
Sign languages of Papua New Guinea